Manuel Benjamín Carrión Mora (April 20, 1897 in Loja – March 9, 1979 in Quito) was an Ecuadorian writer, diplomat and cultural promoter.

Biography

He was born into an aristocratic family in Loja.  He was a lawyer by training, and occupied various positions in the public arena, including Minister of Education and legislator. He was also a diplomat in several countries of Europe and the Americas and most notably served as the ambassador to Mexico and Chile.

Carrión was also a professor at the Central University of Ecuador, and a journalist. In this later capacity he founded the newspaper El Sol with Alfredo Pareja Diezcanseco. Due to his political views, he was close to the socialist and later communist realms of Ecuadorian society.

In 1934 he published what many critics consider to be his greatest work, Atahuallpa, a biography of the Spanish conquest of the Inca empire, which has been translated into English and French.

In 1944, he founded the Casa de la Cultura Ecuatoriana (House of Ecuadorian Culture) and became its first President. He was a tireless crusader for the House, and despite great odds, was able to inaugurate its first and main building in May 1947. The building stands now as an icon of the city of Quito. Benjamín Carrión Palace was completed in 1948.

From the beginning he emphasized the importance of the House's Museums, Library and Press. He published the influential literary magazine Letras del Ecuador under the direction of among others, his nephew Alejandro Carrión. He also published a number of key Ecuadorian authors.

The House of the Culture has, in its more than 20 years of work, supported a multitude of writers and painters both inside and outside the country. It has also allowed for Ecuadorian culture to be known in the international field. Though his legacy as a writer can be considered controversial in importance, he stands as Ecuador's foremost promoter of culture.

Awards and honors
 1968: Benito Juárez Prize (Mexico)
 1975: The first recipient of Ecuador's highest national prize Premio Eugenio Espejo

Bibliography
 El desencanto de Miguel García (1929)
 Obras de Benjamín Carrión
 Nuevas Cartas al Ecuador
 Los Creadores de la Nueva América
 Mapa de America (1931)
 San Miguel de Unamuno
 Santa Gabriela Mistral
 Puerto Rico
 Índice de la Poesía Ecuatoriana Contemporánea
 Por Qué Jesús No Vuelve
 El Santo del Patíbulo
 Atahuallpa (1934)
 El Cuento de la Patria
 El Nuevo Relato Ecuatoriano
 El Libro de los Prólogos
 El Pensamiento Vivo de Juan Montalvo
 América Dada al Diablo
 Correspondencia de Benjamín Carrión

References

1897 births
1979 deaths
People from Loja, Ecuador
Ecuadorian male writers
Ecuadorian journalists
Male journalists
Government ministers of Ecuador
Members of the National Congress (Ecuador)
Ambassadors of Ecuador to Chile
Ambassadors of Ecuador to Mexico
Academic staff of the Central University of Ecuador
20th-century journalists